Twice-cooked pork or double-cooked pork (literally "returned to the pan (wok)") is a Chinese dish in Sichuan cuisine. The pork is simmered, sliced, and then stir-fried -- "returned to the wok." The pork is accompanied with stir-fried vegetables, most commonly leeks, but often cabbage, bell peppers, onions, or scallions. The sauce may include Shaoxing rice wine, hoisin sauce, soy sauce, sugar, ginger, chili bean paste, and tianmianjiang bean paste.

This dish is commonly associated with yan jian rou, which tastes quite similar, but cooked in a different process.

Preparation

The process of cooking twice-cooked pork involves first simmering pork belly steaks in water with spices, such as ginger, cloves, star anise, jujubes, or salt. After refrigeration to firm the meat, it is cut into thin slices.The pork is then returned to a wok and shallow fried in oil, usually along with some vegetables. The most commonly used vegetables are garlic leaves, napa cabbage, bell peppers, and scallions. 

Another simple way of preparing this dish is to cook the meat by itself until it is done, then fry it along with the other ingredients. An alternative method involves frying the meat by itself until cooked, frying the vegetables separately, then frying everything together. 

Premade twice-cooked pork sauces are also available from food manufacturers.

History
The origins of twice-cooked pork are unknown.

The Sichuan people have a tradition of enjoying a feast every 1st and 15th of traditional Chinese calendar months, with twice-cooked pork as the main course.

References
. Internet Archive ONLINE.
. Internet Archive ONLINE

Notes

External links 
 Sichuan Twice-Cooked Pork Recipe Video
 Yan Jian Rou Recipe: How to Cook Pan Fried Salted Pork

Sichuan cuisine
Chinese pork dishes